Asaki (written: 朝基) is a Japanese surname. Notable people with the surname include:

, Japanese councilwoman
, Japanese ski jumping official
, Japanese manga artist

See also
Asachi, a Romanian surname

Japanese-language surnames